Kvarme is a Norwegian surname. Notable people with the surname include:

 Bjørn Tore Kvarme (born 1972), Norwegian footballer
  (born 1963), Norwegian actor
 Ole Christian Kvarme (born 1948), Norwegian Lutheran bishop

Norwegian-language surnames